The Blériot-SPAD S.56 was a family of French airliners developed in the 1920s as various refinements of the S.33 design.  All S.56 versions shared two new features: the first was a newly designed, all-metal wing, replacing the wooden wing of earlier related designs and the second was a redesigned passenger cabin, replacing the S.33's four single seats in a row with two rows of double seats. A second access door was also added.

Variants
S.56/1basic version with  Salmson CM.9 radial engine and later a  Gnome & Rhône 9Aa. 1 built.

S.56/2similar to the S.56/1, with a  Gnome & Rhône 9Ab engine. 1 built.

S.56/3similar to S.56/2 with improved landing gear and  Gnome & Rhône 9Aa engine. 8 built.

S.56/4major fuselage revision; cockpit relocated between engine and passenger cabin (in all previous S.33 derivatives, it had been aft of the cabin) and an extra double seat added to the cabin, increasing internal passenger capacity to six. Powered by  Gnome & Rhône 9Ady engines. 8 built, plus 2 modified from S.56/3s.

S.56/5revised passenger cabin with four seats located in one compartment, and two in a second compartment that could be quickly converted to a freight hold. 2 built, plus 6 modified from S.56/3s and 2 from S.56/4s.

S.56/6similar to S.56/3 but customised for banner towing for the Air Publicité company, powered by a  Gnome & Rhône 9Ab engine. 2 built; one ended up as a transport in the Spanish Republican Air Force during the Spanish Civil War.

Operators

Air Union (S.56/3, S.56/4)
CIDNA (S.56/1, S.56/3, S.56/4, S.56/5)

Spanish Republican Air Force (S.56/6)

Specifications (S.56/4)

See also

References

Further reading

External links
Aviastar

1920s French airliners
Single-engined tractor aircraft
Biplanes
Blériot aircraft
Aircraft first flown in 1923